Layyah District, is a district in the Punjab, Pakistan. It is located in the southern part of the province. Layyah City is the district headquarter of Layyah District. Layyah has hot desert climate.

The main languages spoken in the district include Saraiki (66.67%), Punjabi (27.79%), Urdu (2.78%), and Pashto (2.29%).

Geography
It lies between 30–45 to 31–24 deg north latitudes and 70–44 to 71–50 deg east longitudes. The area consists of a semi-rectangular block of sandy land between the Indus River and the Chenab River in Sindh Sagar Doab.

History
The town was founded around 1550 by Kamal Khan, who laid foundation of Dera Ghazi Khan. Around 1610, the town was taken from the Rulers, who held it until 1787. Abdun Nabi Sarai was appointed Governor by Timur Shah Durrani, but three years later it was included in the Governorship of Muhammad Khan Sadozai, who transferred his seat of Government to Mankera. In 1794, Humayun Shah, the rival claimant to the throne of Kabul, was captured near Layyah and brought into the town, where his eyes were put out by order of Zaman Shah. Under the Sikh Government, the town once more became the centre of administration for the neighbouring tract, and after the British occupation in 1849, was for a time the headquarters of a Civil Administrative Division. This administrative status of Layyah was short-lived and the British reduced it to the level of Tehsil headquarters, making it a part of Dera Ismail Khan. In 1901, Layyah was transferred to the new District of Mianwali. Later on, it was made part of the Muzaffargarh District. In 1982, Layyah Tehsil was upgraded to District headquarters comprising three Tehsils: Layyah, Karor and Chaubara. The municipality was created in 1875.

Administrative divisions
The district of Layyah is made up of three tehsils:

Chaubara Tehsil
Karor Lal Esan Tehsil
Layyah Tehsil

Main Towns 
There are Four main towns of District Layyah are:
Chowk Azam
Fatehpur
Kot Sultan
Pahar Pur

Villages 
 

Metlawala

Education 
According to Pakistan District Education Ranking, a report released by Alif Ailaan, Layyah is ranked at number 38 out of 155 districts nationally with an education score of 66.76. The learning score of Layyah is 70.8. The readiness score of Layyah is 65.13 ranking the district at number 31. Furthermore, the school infrastructure score of Layyah is 94.38, placing it a national rank of 18. The score reflects that most schools in Layyah have all basic facilities e.g. electricity, drinking water and functional toilets.
The issues reported in TaleemDo! App by the residents of Layyah suggest that students of government schools have low confidence as compared to private schools, but the students can’t go to private schools because of high fees. Complaints about quality of teachers and a few basic facilities are also the issues reported in the app.

Higher Education 
In education Layyah is improving day by day.

Public Sector Colleges 
There are 20 colleges available for the education of males and females of Layyah. 
 	
 Boys	06
  	Girls	09
  	Commerce	05
 Total	20

Private Sector Colleges 

 Boys	08
  	Girls	03
  	Commerce & Business	03
 Total 	14

Public Sector Universities 
 Bahadar Sub-Campus of BZU

Departments 
 Department of Business Administration
 Department of English
 Department of Economics
 Department of Psychology
 Department of Sociology
 Department of Education

Colleges 
 College of Veterinary Sciences
 College of Agriculture

Private Sector Universities 
 Govt. College University Faisalabad (Layyah Campus)
 University of Education, Lahore (Layyah Campus)
 Govt. College University, Lahore (Layyah Campus)
 National College of Business Administration & Economics Lahore (Layyah Campus)

Small Dams 
There are 17 small dams in the district to provide water for irrigation.
 Khokher Zer Dam
 Surlah Dam
 Dhok Talian Dam
 Kot Raja Dam
 Dhoke Qutab Din Dam
 Nikka Dam
 Walana Dam
 Khai Gurabh Dam
 Pira Fatehal Dam
 Bhagtal Dam
 Dhurnal Dam
 Mial Dam
 Kanwal Dam
 Dhrabi Dam
 Khai Dam
 Chowkhandi Dam
 Minwal Dam

Industries 
There are multiple industries in Layyah.	
	
 Sugar Mill	01
  	Rice Factories	15
  	Cotton Ginning Factories	25
  	Ice Factories	18
  	Vegetable Ghee Factory	0
  	Cold Storage	05
  	Flour Mills	13
 	Total	78

Land Statistics 
Land of Layyah is categorized in 6 parts.  	
       Cultivated Area	        10,12,828 Acres
  	Irrigated Area	        8,32,306 Acres
  	Barani Area	        1,80,522 Acres
  	Uncultivated Area	5, 39,820 Acres
  	Culture able Waste	59,600 Acres
  	Un-Culture able Area	4,80,220 Acres

Types of irrigation 
Irrigation of layyah is divided in 3 types.	
       Revierian Area	        2,01,572 Acres
  	Thal Irrigated Area	6,70,633 Acres
  	Thal Barani Area	6,80,433 Acres

Transportation 
There are 2 main means of transportation used in layyah listed below.

Road Network 

Road Network of the district is linked as:

Layyah toward Kot Addu-Muzaffargarh,
D.G.Khan, Rajanpur and so on to Karachi
Layyah to Bhakhar-Mianwali and so on to Islamabad
Layyah to Multan
Layyah to Jhang-Toba Tek Singh-Faisalabad-Sahiwal and so on to Lahore

Rail Network 
Rail Network of the district is linked as:

Rail Network also available for Layyah to Muzaffargarh & Multan and Layyah to Bhakkar - Mianwali to Rawalpindi / Islamabad

Floods
Sehar village residents flood-prone Layyah district, had seen their homes repeatedly inundated and they finally took matters into their own hands and rebuilt their homes on raised dirt platforms five to six feet high, shored up with eucalyptus trees planted around the edges.

Demography
At the time of the 2017 census the district had a population of 1,823,995, of which 924,837 were males and 899,016 females. Rural population is 1,502,821 while the urban population is 321,174. The literacy rate was 58.19%. Muslims were the predominant religious community with 99.35% of the population while Christians were 0.53% of the population.

At the time of the 2017 census, 66.67% of the population spoke Saraiki, 27.79% Punjabi, 2.78% Urdu and 2.29% Pashto as their first language.

Gallery

References

 
Districts of Punjab, Pakistan